Vytautas Mitalas (born 16 June 1989 in Vilnius) is a Deputy Speaker of the Seimas and Member of the Seimas since November 2020. He is also former Vice Mayor of Vilnius.

Biography 
He graduated with honors from Vilnius Žemyna Gymnasium.

He obtained a bachelor's degree in political science and later a master's degree in public policy analysis from the Institute of International Relations and Political Science of Vilnius University. During his studies, since 2008, he has been involved in the activities of political and non-governmental organizations.

Mitalas was the chairman of the Vilnius Liberal Youth Organization, a national member of the Youth Affairs Council, and a member of the board of the Vilnius Union of Youth Organizations "Round Table".

Political life
In 2015, he was elected to the Vilnius City Municipal Council, where he became the chairman of the Committee on Culture, Education and Sports.

He worked in the secretariat of the Liberal Movement and as an expert of the Lithuanian Free Market Institute.

From 2019 to 2020 He was the vice mayor of Vilnius and was responsible for schools, economy and transport, urban development and social issues.

From November 2020 he is Member of the Seimas.

References 

1989 births
21st-century Lithuanian politicians
Freedom Party (Lithuania) politicians
Liberal Movement (Lithuania) politicians
Living people
Members of the Seimas
Politicians from Vilnius
Vilnius University alumni